Mariamman Kovil or Punnainallur is a village in the district of Thanjavur, Tamil Nadu, India.  It is located 6 km east of Thanjavur town, on the Thanjavur - Nagapattinam Highway. It is home to the famous amman temple Punnainallur Mariamman temple. The village is also home to the Kathaiamman Temple and few other temples in the surroundings. It can be reached by road via public transport from Thanjavur town with many buses plying from there. The nearest railway station is Thanjavur Junction, and nearest airport is Thiruchirapalli

Once a small hamlet that developed around the Punnainallur Mariamman temple, is today a village with basic amenities such as a high school, Hospital, Electricity Board office, Telephone Exchange, Post Office etc. Small time retailers (old and new) cater to the Mariamman Kovil consumers' daily requirements. Other than temple tourism, the locals engage in agriculture and dairy businesses for their livelihood. The village becomes buzzing during the annual festival called Mariamman Kovil Thiruvizha, which includes various Hindu religion rituals in the temple and festivities such as musical performances, dance etc. The district of Thanjavur has a lineage of musicians and artists, which can be seen in full glory during this festival.

Agriculture was once sprawling, now has fewer takers. Most of the current generation villagers have migrated to nearby towns and cities such as Thanjavur, Tiruchirapalli, Nagapattinam etc.

References
  Pariharam.com Mariamman Temple
  Indiainfoweb.com Punnainallur Mariamman Temple
  Official website of Thanjavur District

Villages in Thanjavur district